Paul Winkler (7 July 1898 in Budapest – 23 September 1982 in Melun) was a French writer, journalist and publisher of Jewish-Hungarian ancestry. Before being the head of Press Alliance, Winkler operated Europe's largest feature syndicate, in France.

Specializing in the distribution of bandes dessinées (comics), Winkler founded several popular magazines. Le Journal de Mickey, first published as an 8-page weekly in October 1934, began a tradition of French Disney comics publishing that continues until the present day. Le Journal de Mickey is now a weekly 60-page magazine, with sister publications Picsou Magazine, Mickey Parade Géant, Super Picsou Géant and Mon Premier Journal de Mickey printing Disney comics in French from around the world. In honor of his dedication to publishing Disney comics, Winkler was given a posthumous Disney Legends award in 1997.

References 

1898 births
1982 deaths
French publishers (people)
Comic book publishers (people)
Hungarian Jews
Hungarian emigrants to France